KNWM (96.1 FM) is a Christmas music formatted radio station licensed to Madrid, Iowa and serving Ames, and the northern Des Moines suburbs. It is owned and operated by University of Northwestern – St. Paul in Roseville, Minnesota, a religious university which owns a chain of radio stations around the U.S. KNWM previously was simulcast with KNWI until its upgrade to 100,000 watts in October of 2021.

History
Up until October 2021, KNWM simulcasted Osceola sister station KNWI. KNWI had recently upgraded from 30kW to 100kW, which resulted in better coverage into Des Moines, meaning that KNWM was no longer needed. Granted, many listeners in Ames have reported not being able to pick 107.1 up. KNWM is currently stunting with a Christmas music format.

References

External links

NWM
Radio stations established in 1983
Northwestern Media